Naturally occurring cadmium (48Cd) is composed of 8 isotopes. For two of them, natural radioactivity was observed, and three others are predicted to be radioactive but their decays have not been observed, due to extremely long half-lives. The two natural radioactive isotopes are 113Cd (beta decay, half-life is 8.04 × 1015 years) and 116Cd (two-neutrino double beta decay, half-life is 2.8 × 1019 years). The other three are 106Cd, 108Cd (double electron capture), and 114Cd (double beta decay); only lower limits on their half-life times have been set. At least three isotopes—110Cd, 111Cd, and 112Cd—are absolutely stable (except, theoretically, to spontaneous fission). Among the isotopes absent in natural cadmium, the most long-lived are 109Cd with a half-life of 462.6 days, and 115Cd with a half-life of 53.46 hours. All of the remaining radioactive isotopes have half-lives that are less than 2.5 hours and the majority of these have half-lives that are less than 5 minutes. This element also has 12 known meta states, with the most stable being 113mCd (t1/2 14.1 years), 115mCd (t1/2 44.6 days) and 117mCd (t1/2 3.36 hours).

The known isotopes of cadmium range in atomic mass from 94.950 u (95Cd) to 131.946 u (132Cd). The primary decay mode before the second most abundant stable isotope, 112Cd, is electron capture and the primary modes after are beta emission and electron capture. The primary decay product before 112Cd is element 47 (silver) and the primary product after is element 49 (indium).

A 2021 study has shown at high ionic strengths, Cd isotope fractionation mainly depends on its complexation with carboxylic sites. At low ionic strengths, nonspecific Cd binding induced by electrostatic attractions plays a dominant role and promotes Cd isotope fractionation during complexation.

List of isotopes 

|-
| 95Cd
| style="text-align:right" | 48
| style="text-align:right" | 47
| 94.94987(64)#
| 5# ms
|
|
| 9/2+#
|
|
|-
| 96Cd
| style="text-align:right" | 48
| style="text-align:right" | 48
| 95.93977(54)#
| 1# s
| β+
| 96Ag
| 0+
|
|
|-
| rowspan=2|97Cd
| rowspan=2 style="text-align:right" | 48
| rowspan=2 style="text-align:right" | 49
| rowspan=2|96.93494(43)#
| rowspan=2|2.8(6) s
| β+ (>99.9%)
| 97Ag
| rowspan=2|9/2+#
| rowspan=2|
| rowspan=2|
|-
| β+, p (<.1%)
| 96Pd
|-
| rowspan=2|98Cd
| rowspan=2 style="text-align:right" | 48
| rowspan=2 style="text-align:right" | 50
| rowspan=2|97.92740(8)
| rowspan=2|9.2(3) s
| β+ (99.975%)
| 98Ag
| rowspan=2|0+
| rowspan=2|
| rowspan=2|
|-
| β+, p (.025%)
| 97Ag
|-
| style="text-indent:1em" | 98mCd
| colspan="3" style="text-indent:2em" | 2427.5(6) keV
| 190(20) ns
|
|
| 8+#
|
|
|-
| rowspan=3|99Cd
| rowspan=3 style="text-align:right" | 48
| rowspan=3 style="text-align:right" | 51
| rowspan=3|98.92501(22)#
| rowspan=3|16(3) s
| β+ (99.78%)
| 99Ag
| rowspan=3|(5/2+)
| rowspan=3|
| rowspan=3|
|-
| β+, p (.21%)
| 98Pd
|-
| β+, α (10−4%)
| 95Rh
|-
| 100Cd
| style="text-align:right" | 48
| style="text-align:right" | 52
| 99.92029(10)
| 49.1(5) s
| β+
| 100Ag
| 0+
|
|
|-
| 101Cd
| style="text-align:right" | 48
| style="text-align:right" | 53
| 100.91868(16)
| 1.36(5) min
| β+
| 101Ag
| (5/2+)
|
|
|-
| 102Cd
| style="text-align:right" | 48
| style="text-align:right" | 54
| 101.91446(3)
| 5.5(5) min
| β+
| 102Ag
| 0+
|
|
|-
| 103Cd
| style="text-align:right" | 48
| style="text-align:right" | 55
| 102.913419(17)
| 7.3(1) min
| β+
| 103Ag
| 5/2+
|
|
|-
| 104Cd
| style="text-align:right" | 48
| style="text-align:right" | 56
| 103.909849(10)
| 57.7(10) min
| β+
| 104Ag
| 0+
|
|
|-
| 105Cd
| style="text-align:right" | 48
| style="text-align:right" | 57
| 104.909468(12)
| 55.5(4) min
| β+
| 105Ag
| 5/2+
|
|
|-
| 106Cd
| style="text-align:right" | 48
| style="text-align:right" | 58
| 105.906459(6)
| colspan=3 align=center|Observationally Stable
| 0+
| 0.0125(6)
|
|-
| 107Cd
| style="text-align:right" | 48
| style="text-align:right" | 59
| 106.906618(6)
| 6.50(2) h
| β+
| 107mAg
| 5/2+
|
|
|-
| 108Cd
| style="text-align:right" | 48
| style="text-align:right" | 60
| 107.904184(6)
| colspan=3 align=center|Observationally Stable
| 0+
| 0.0089(3)
|
|-
| 109Cd
| style="text-align:right" | 48
| style="text-align:right" | 61
| 108.904982(4)
| 461.4(12) d
| EC
| 109Ag
| 5/2+
|
|
|-
| style="text-indent:1em" | 109m1Cd
| colspan="3" style="text-indent:2em" | 59.6(4) keV
| 12(2) µs
|
|
| 1/2+
|
|
|-
| style="text-indent:1em" | 109m2Cd
| colspan="3" style="text-indent:2em" | 463.0(5) keV
| 10.9(5) µs
|
|
| 11/2
|
|
|-
| 110Cd
| style="text-align:right" | 48
| style="text-align:right" | 62
| 109.9030021(29)
| colspan=3 align=center|Stable
| 0+
| 0.1249(18)
|
|-
| 111Cd
| style="text-align:right" | 48
| style="text-align:right" | 63
| 110.9041781(29)
| colspan=3 align=center|Stable
| 1/2+
| 0.1280(12)
|
|-
| style="text-indent:1em" | 111mCd
| colspan="3" style="text-indent:2em" | 396.214(21) keV
| 48.50(9) min
| IT
| 111Cd
| 11/2−
|
|
|-
| 112Cd
| style="text-align:right" | 48
| style="text-align:right" | 64
| 111.9027578(29)
| colspan=3 align=center|Stable
| 0+
| 0.2413(21)
|
|-
| 113Cd
| style="text-align:right" | 48
| style="text-align:right" | 65
| 112.9044017(29)
| 8.04(5)×1015 y
| β−
| 113In
| 1/2+
| 0.1222(12)
|
|-
| rowspan=2 style="text-indent:1em" | 113mCd
| rowspan=2 colspan="3" style="text-indent:2em" | 263.54(3) keV
| rowspan=2|14.1(5) y
| β− (99.86%)
| 113In
| rowspan=2|11/2−
| rowspan=2|
| rowspan=2|
|-
| IT (.139%)
| 113Cd
|-
| 114Cd
| style="text-align:right" | 48
| style="text-align:right" | 66
| 113.9033585(29)
| colspan=3 align=center|Observationally Stable
| 0+
| 0.2873(42)
|
|-
| 115Cd
| style="text-align:right" | 48
| style="text-align:right" | 67
| 114.9054310(29)
| 53.46(5) h
| β−
| 115mIn
| 1/2+
|
|
|-
| style="text-indent:1em" | 115mCd
| colspan="3" style="text-indent:2em" | 181.0(5) keV
| 44.56(24) d
| β−
| 115mIn
| (11/2)−
|
|
|-
| 116Cd
| style="text-align:right" | 48
| style="text-align:right" | 68
| 115.904756(3)
| 2.8(2)×1019 y
| β−β−
| 116Sn
| 0+
| 0.0749(18)
|
|-
| 117Cd
| style="text-align:right" | 48
| style="text-align:right" | 69
| 116.907219(4)
| 2.49(4) h
| β−
| 117mIn
| 1/2+
|
|
|-
| style="text-indent:1em" | 117mCd
| colspan="3" style="text-indent:2em" | 136.4(2) keV
| 3.36(5) h
| β−
| 117mIn
| (11/2)−
|
|
|-
| 118Cd
| style="text-align:right" | 48
| style="text-align:right" | 70
| 117.906915(22)
| 50.3(2) min
| β−
| 118In
| 0+
|
|
|-
| 119Cd
| style="text-align:right" | 48
| style="text-align:right" | 71
| 118.90992(9)
| 2.69(2) min
| β−
| 119mIn
| (3/2+)
|
|
|-
| style="text-indent:1em" | 119mCd
| colspan="3" style="text-indent:2em" | 146.54(11) keV
| 2.20(2) min
| β−
| 119mIn
| (11/2−)#
|
|
|-
| 120Cd
| style="text-align:right" | 48
| style="text-align:right" | 72
| 119.90985(2)
| 50.80(21) s
| β−
| 120In
| 0+
|
|
|-
| 121Cd
| style="text-align:right" | 48
| style="text-align:right" | 73
| 120.91298(9)
| 13.5(3) s
| β−
| 121mIn
| (3/2+)
|
|
|-
| style="text-indent:1em" | 121mCd
| colspan="3" style="text-indent:2em" | 214.86(15) keV
| 8.3(8) s
| β−
| 121mIn
| (11/2−)
|
|
|-
| 122Cd
| style="text-align:right" | 48
| style="text-align:right" | 74
| 121.91333(5)
| 5.24(3) s
| β−
| 122In
| 0+
|
|
|-
| 123Cd
| style="text-align:right" | 48
| style="text-align:right" | 75
| 122.91700(4)
| 2.10(2) s
| β−
| 123mIn
| (3/2)+
|
|
|-
| rowspan=2 style="text-indent:1em" | 123mCd
| rowspan=2 colspan="3" style="text-indent:2em" | 316.52(23) keV
| rowspan=2|1.82(3) s
| β−
| 123In
| rowspan=2|(11/2−)
| rowspan=2|
| rowspan=2|
|- 
| IT
| 123Cd
|-
| 124Cd
| style="text-align:right" | 48
| style="text-align:right" | 76
| 123.91765(7)
| 1.25(2) s
| β−
| 124In
| 0+
|
|
|-
| 125Cd
| style="text-align:right" | 48
| style="text-align:right" | 77
| 124.92125(7)
| 0.65(2) s
| β−
| 125mIn
| (3/2+)#
|
|
|-
| style="text-indent:1em" | 125mCd
| colspan="3" style="text-indent:2em" | 50(70) keV
| 570(90) ms
| β−
| 125In
| 11/2−#
|
|
|-
| 126Cd
| style="text-align:right" | 48
| style="text-align:right" | 78
| 125.92235(6)
| 0.515(17) s
| β−
| 126In
| 0+
|
|
|-
| 127Cd
| style="text-align:right" | 48
| style="text-align:right" | 79
| 126.92644(8)
| 0.37(7) s
| β−
| 127mIn
| (3/2+)
|
|
|-
| 128Cd
| style="text-align:right" | 48
| style="text-align:right" | 80
| 127.92776(32)
| 0.28(4) s
| β−
| 128In
| 0+
|
|
|-
| rowspan=2|129Cd
| rowspan=2 style="text-align:right" | 48
| rowspan=2 style="text-align:right" | 81
| rowspan=2|128.93215(32)#
| rowspan=2|242(8) ms
| β− (>99.9%)
| 129In
| rowspan=2|3/2+#
| rowspan=2|
| rowspan=2|
|-
| IT (<.1%)
| 129Cd
|-
| style="text-indent:1em" | 129mCd
| colspan="3" style="text-indent:2em" | 0(200)# keV
| 104(6) ms
|
|
| 11/2−#
|
|
|-
| rowspan=2|130Cd
| rowspan=2 style="text-align:right" | 48
| rowspan=2 style="text-align:right" | 82
| rowspan=2|129.9339(3)
| rowspan=2|162(7) ms
| β− (96%)
| 130In
| rowspan=2|0+
| rowspan=2|
| rowspan=2|
|-
| β−, n (4%)
| 129In
|-
| 131Cd
| style="text-align:right" | 48
| style="text-align:right" | 83
| 130.94067(32)#
| 68(3) ms
|
|
| 7/2−#
|
|
|-
| 132Cd
| style="text-align:right" | 48
| style="text-align:right" | 84
| 131.94555(54)#
| 97(10) ms
|
|
| 0+
|
|

 Hyperdeformation is predicted to be found in 107Cd.

Cadmium-113m 

Cadmium-113m is a cadmium radioisotope and nuclear isomer with a half-life of 14.1 years. In a normal thermal reactor, it has a very low fission product yield, plus its large neutron capture cross section means that most of even the small amount produced is destroyed in the course of the nuclear fuel's burnup; thus, this isotope is not a significant contributor to nuclear waste.

Fast fission or fission of some heavier actinides will produce 113mCd at higher yields.

References 

 Isotope masses from:

 Isotopic compositions and standard atomic masses from:

 Half-life, spin, and isomer data selected from the following sources.

 
Cadmium
Cadmium